Pourouma oraria is a species of flowering plant in the genus Pourouma. It is found in Colombia, Panama, and Peru. It is threatened by habitat loss.

References

oraria
Vulnerable plants
Trees of Peru
Taxonomy articles created by Polbot